El Hogar Filipino Building, also known simply as El Hogar, is an early skyscraper in Manila, Philippines. Built in 1914 and located at the corner of Juan Luna Street and Muelle dela Industría in the Binondo district, El Hogar Building was designed by Ramon Irureta-Goyena and Francisco Perez-Muñoz in the Beaux-Arts style. Its architecture reflects elements of Neoclassical and Renaissance styles.

El Hogar Building was built as a wedding present of Antonio Melian y Pavia, third Count of Peracamps, to his bride Margarita Zóbel de Ayala, who was a sister of Enrique Zóbel de Ayala in 1914. During its heyday, El Hogar Building housed the Sociedad El Hogar Filipino, a financing cooperative founded by Melian, and the offices of Smith Bell and Company

It survived World War II and a number of earthquakes and is one of two remaining American-era structures in the area facing the Pasig River. Right across Juan Luna Street, on its northern front, is another important edifice, the Pacific Commercial Company Building or commonly known as the First National City Bank Building which was built in 1922.

The value of the building is its architecture, which is a representation of American period design, materials, and construction method. El Hogar Building is a representation of the architecture of business establishments of that era. It also has a collective value as one of the significant structures within the historic Binondo district and Escolta Street, along the cultural landscape of the Pasig River.

References

Buildings and structures in Binondo
Tourist attractions in Manila
Buildings and structures completed in 1914
Zobel de Ayala family